Nieuw Amsterdam is a railway station located in Nieuw Amsterdam, Netherlands. The station was opened on 1 November 1905 and is located on the Zwolle–Emmen railway. Train services are operated by Arriva under the name Blauwnet.

Train services

Bus services
There is no regular bus service at this station, but the Hubtaxi (a small taxi bus that operates if called one hour in advance) does serve the station.

See also
 List of railway stations in Drenthe

External links
NS website 
Dutch Public Transport journey planner 

Railway stations in Drenthe
Railway stations opened in 1905
Railway stations on the Emmerlijn
1905 establishments in the Netherlands
Buildings and structures in Emmen, Netherlands
Railway stations in the Netherlands opened in the 20th century